Union of European Football Associations (UEFA  ;) is one of six continental bodies of governance in association football. It governs football, futsal and beach football in Europe and the transcontinental countries of Russia, Turkey, Azerbaijan, Georgia, and Kazakhstan, as well as some Asian countries such as Israel, Cyprus and Armenia. UEFA consists of 55 national association members. Because of the 2022 Russian invasion of Ukraine, FIFA and UEFA suspended all Russian national teams and clubs from any FIFA and UEFA competitions.

UEFA consists of the national football associations of Europe, and runs national and club competitions including the UEFA European Championship, UEFA Nations League, UEFA Champions League, UEFA Europa League, UEFA Europa Conference League, and UEFA Super Cup, and also controls the prize money, regulations, as well as media rights to those competitions.

Henri Delaunay acted as the first general secretary and Ebbe Schwartz as the first president. The current president is Aleksander Čeferin, a former Football Association of Slovenia president, who was elected as UEFA's seventh president at the 12th Extraordinary UEFA Congress in Athens in September 2016, and automatically became a vice-president of the world body FIFA.

History and membership
UEFA was inaugurated on 15 June 1954 in Basel, Switzerland after consultation between the Italian, French, and Belgian associations. At the founding meeting, 25 members were present. However, 6 other associations which were not present were still recognised as founding members, bringing the total of founding associations to 31. UEFA grew to more than 50 members by the mid-1990s, as new associations were born out of the fragmentation of the Soviet Union, Yugoslavia and Czechoslovakia into their constituent states.

UEFA's main headquarters after its foundation were located in Paris, but moved to Bern in 1960. They moved to Nyon, Switzerland, in 1995, where they operated out of temporary offices until 1999 while the organisation's current headquarters were under construction.

UEFA membership coincides for the most part with recognition as a sovereign country in Europe (48 out of 55 members are sovereign UN member states), although there are some exceptions. One UN member state (Monaco) and one UN General Assembly non-member observer state (Vatican City) are not members. Some UEFA members are not sovereign states, but form part of a larger recognised sovereign state in the context of international law. These include England, Northern Ireland, Scotland and Wales (constituent countries of the United Kingdom), Gibraltar (British Overseas Territory), the Faroe Islands (autonomous territory within the Kingdom of Denmark), and Kosovo (state with limited recognition), however, in the context of these countries, government functions concerning sport tend to be carried at the territorial level coterminous with the UEFA member entity.

Some UEFA members are transcontinental states (Azerbaijan, Georgia, Kazakhstan, Russia and Turkey) and others are considered part of Europe both culturally and politically (Cyprus and Armenia). Countries which had been members of the Asian Football Confederation (AFC) were also admitted to the European football association, such as Israel (because it had been banned from the AFC group in 1974) and Kazakhstan.

Some UEFA member associations allow teams from outside their association's main territory to take part in their "domestic" competition. AS Monaco, for example, takes part in the French League (though a separate sovereign entity); Welsh clubs Cardiff City, Swansea City and Newport County A.F.C. participate in the English League; Derry City, situated in Northern Ireland, plays in the Republic of Ireland-based League of Ireland and the 7 native Liechtenstein teams play in the Swiss Leagues, as Liechtenstein has no internal league  and only a cup competition.

National teams represented by UEFA are known for being successful throughout the history of the FIFA World Cup. Out of 22 tournaments so far, European teams have won 12 World Cup titles. Italy and Germany have four titles each, followed by France with two titles and England and Spain, winning once each. The national associations of these countries also are responsible for organizing the so-called "Big Five European Leagues", consisting of Spain's La Liga, England's Premier League, Germany's Bundesliga, Italy's Serie A and France's Ligue 1.

On 28 February 2022, due to the 2022 Russian invasion of Ukraine and in accordance with a recommendation by the International Olympic Committee (IOC), the UEFA suspended the participation of Russia.  The Russian Football Union unsuccessfully appealed the UEFA ban to the Court of Arbitration for Sport, which upheld the ban.

Executive committee

President
  Aleksander Čeferin

Vice-presidents
  Karl-Erik Nilsson – First Vice-president 
  Zbigniew Boniek
  Sándor Csányi
  Fernando Gomes
  Luis Rubiales
  David Gill
  Michele Uva

Members
  Armand Duka 
  Alexander Dyukov
  Gabriele Gravina
  Florence Hardouin
  Laura McAllister
  Rainer Koch
  Jesper Møller 
  Andriy Pavelko 
  Just Spee
  Davor Šuker
  Servet Yardımcı
  Karl-Heinz Rummenigge
  Nasser Al-Khelaifi
  Javier Tebas

General secretary
  Theodore Theodoridis

Deputy general secretary
  Giorgio Marchetti

Treasurer
  David Gill

Head of club competitions and calendar
  Tobias Hedtstück

Head of national competitions
  Lance Kelly

Members

Former members

Non-members
There are several national teams within Europe that are not members of UEFA. Many of them are instead affiliated with CONIFA.

There are two independent European states that have national teams that are not affiliated with UEFA or FIFA. Both are microstates.

The Crown Dependencies, which are not technically part of the United Kingdom, have official teams not affiliated with UEFA or FIFA

, whose membership application was rejected by UEFA in 2018
 Autonomous region of Finland

Several European states with limited recognition have official national teams, but none have been considered for UEFA membership.

Competitions

UEFA continental competitions

National teams:
UEFA European Championship
UEFA Nations League 
UEFA European Under-21 Championship
UEFA European Under-19 Championship
UEFA European Under-17 Championship
UEFA Women's Championship
UEFA Women's Nations League (future)
UEFA Women's Under-19 Championship
UEFA Women's Under-17 Championship
UEFA Futsal Championship
UEFA Under-19 Futsal Championship
UEFA Women's Futsal Championship
Defunct
UEFA Under-21 Futsal Tournament

Clubs:
UEFA Champions League
UEFA Europa League
UEFA Europa Conference League
UEFA Super Cup
UEFA Youth League
UEFA Women's Champions League
UEFA Futsal Champions League
Defunct
UEFA Cup Winners' Cup
UEFA Intertoto Cup

Amateur:
UEFA Regions' Cup
Defunct
UEFA Amateur Cup

UEFA runs official international competitions in Europe and some countries of Northern, Southwestern and Central Asia for national teams and professional clubs, known as UEFA competitions, some of which are regarded as the world's most prestigious tournaments.

UEFA is the organiser of two of the most prestigious competitions in international football: The UEFA European Championship and the UEFA Nations League. The main competition for men's national teams is the UEFA European Championship (also known as the Euro), which started in 1958, with the first finals in 1960, and was known as the European Nations Cup until 1964. The UEFA Nations League is the second tournament of UEFA and was introduced in 2018. The tournament largely replaced the international friendly matches previously played on the FIFA International Match Calendar. It will be played every two years.

UEFA also runs national competitions at Under-21, Under-19 and Under-17 levels. For women's national teams, UEFA operates the UEFA Women's Championship for senior national sides as well as Women's Under-19 and Women's Under-17 Championships.

World, Olympic and intercontinental competitions

Intercontinental national teams:
CONMEBOL–UEFA Cup of Champions
Women's Finalissima
Futsal Finalissima
Defunct
UEFA–CAF Meridian Cup

Intercontinental clubs:
Under-20 Intercontinental Cup
Defunct
Intercontinental Champions' Supercup
Intercontinental Cup

Beside continental European competitions for national and their junior teams, the UEFA organizes various qualification male and female tournaments among European national and their junior teams for World Cups (organized by FIFA) and Olympics (organized by IOC).

UEFA also organised the UEFA–CAF Meridian Cup with CAF for youth teams in an effort to boost youth football. UEFA launched the UEFA Regions' Cup, for semi-professional teams representing their local region, in 1999. In futsal there is the UEFA Futsal Championship and UEFA Under-19 Futsal Championship. Despite the existence of UEFA's Futsal and Beach soccer committee, UEFA does not organise any beach soccer competitions. International and club beach soccer competitions for UEFA members are organised externally by Beach Soccer Worldwide.

The Italian, German, Spanish, French and Russian men's national teams are the only teams to have won the European football championship in all categories.

Club

The top-ranked UEFA competition is the UEFA Champions League, which started in the 1992/93 season and gathers the top 1–4 teams of each country's league (the number of teams depend on that country's ranking and can be upgraded or downgraded); this competition was re-structured from a previous one that only gathered the top team of each country (held from 1955 to 1992 and known as the European Champion Clubs' Cup or simply the European Cup).

A second, lower-ranked competition is the UEFA Europa League. This competition, for national knockout cup winners and high-placed league teams, was launched by UEFA in 1971 as a successor of both the former UEFA Cup and the Inter-Cities Fairs Cup (also began in 1955). A third competition, the UEFA Cup Winners' Cup, which started in 1960, was absorbed into the UEFA Cup (now UEFA Europa League) in 1999.

In December 2018, UEFA announced the creation of a third club competition, later named the UEFA Europa Conference League. The competition proper features 32 teams in 8 groups of 4, with a knockout round between the second placed teams in Europa Conference League and the third placed teams in the Europa League, leading to a final 16 knockout stage featuring the eight group winners. The first edition of the competition was played in 2021–2022.

In women's football UEFA also conducts the UEFA Women's Champions League for club teams. The competition was first held in 2001, and was known as the UEFA Women's Cup until 2009.

The UEFA Super Cup pits the winners of the Champions League against the winners of the Europa League (previously the winners of the Cup Winners' Cup), and came into being in 1973.

The UEFA Intertoto Cup was a summer competition, previously operated by several Central European football associations, which was relaunched and recognised as official UEFA club competition by UEFA in 1995. The last Intertoto Cup took place in 2008.

The European/South American Cup was jointly organised with CONMEBOL between the Champions League and the Copa Libertadores winners.

Only five teams (Juventus, Ajax, Manchester United, Bayern Munich and Chelsea) have won each of the three main competitions (European Cup/UEFA Champions League, European Cup Winners' Cup/UEFA Cup Winners' Cup and UEFA Cup/UEFA Europa League), a feat that is no longer possible for any team that did not win the Cup Winners' Cup. There are currently eight teams throughout Europe that have won two of the three trophies; all but one have won the Cup Winners' Cup, four require a win in the Champions League and four require a UEFA Europa League win.

Until the first staging of the UEFA Europa Conference League in 2022, Juventus of Italy was the only team in Europe to win all UEFA's official championships and cups and, in commemoration of achieving that feat, have received The UEFA Plaque by the Union of European Football Associations on 12 July 1988.

UEFA's premier futsal competition is the UEFA Futsal Cup, a tournament started in 2001 which replaced the former Futsal European Clubs Championship. This event, despite enjoying a long and well-established tradition in the European futsal community, dating back to 1984, was never recognised as official by UEFA.

Recently, there has been an attempt to create a Europa League-style second tier women's club competition, which has been in discussion since 2021.

Current title holders

Titles by nation

Sponsors
UEFA national team competitions

Adidas
Alipay
Atos

UEFA Champions League

Expedia Group
Expedia
FedEx
Oppo
Heineken N.V.
 Heineken
Just Eat Takeaway
MasterCard
Sony
PlayStation
PepsiCo
Pepsi
Lay's
Gatorade
Turkish Airlines

UEFA Europa League

bwin
Enterprise
Hankook
Heineken
Just Eat Takeaway
Strauss
Swissquote

UEFA women's football competitions

EA Sports
Euronics
Grifols
Heineken
Hublot
Just Eat Takeaway
Lay's
Visa

FIFA World Rankings

Overview

Historical leaders
Men's
 Highest Ranked UEFA memberin the men's FIFA World Rankings

Team of the Year

Major tournament records 
Legend
 – Champions
 – Runners-up
 – Third place
 – Fourth place
QF – Quarter-finals (1934–1938, 1954–1970, and 1986–present: knockout round of 8)
R2 – Round 2 (1974–1978, second group stage, top 8; 1982: second group stage, top 12; 1986–2022: knockout round of 16)
R1 – Round 1 (1930, 1950–1970 and 1986–present: group stage; 1934–1938: knockout round of 16; 1974–1982: first group stage)
Q — Qualified for upcoming tournament
 – Did not qualify
 – Did not enter / Withdrew / Banned
 – Hosts

For each tournament, the flag of the host country and the number of teams in each finals tournament (in brackets) are shown.

FIFA World Cup

FIFA Women's World Cup

Olympic Games For Men

Olympic Games For Women

UEFA European Championship

UEFA Women's Championship

FIFA U-20 World Cup

FIFA U-20 Women's World Cup

FIFA U-17 World Cup

FIFA U-17 Women's World Cup

FIFA Futsal World Cup

FIFA Beach Soccer World Cup

Former tournaments

FIFA Confederations Cup

Sanctions

Against associations
  Lithuania, in 1990 sanctions were imposed due to the secession of the Lithuanian Football Federation from the Football Federation of the Soviet Union
  FR Yugoslavia, in 1992–1998 sanctions were imposed due to the Bosnian War (as part of the Yugoslav Wars)
  Russia, in 2022 sanctions were imposed due to the 2022 Russian invasion of Ukraine.
  Belarus, in 2022 sanctions were imposed due to supporting Russia in the Ukraine conflict.

Against clubs 
  Albania, in 1967 special sanctions were imposed against 1966–67 Albanian Superliga due to its political background
  England, in 1985–1991 sanctions were imposed against English association football clubs due to the Heysel Stadium disaster by suspending their participation in continental competitions for five years
  Italy, in 1974–1975 sanctions were imposed against SS Lazio due to its fans, Italy was restricted from the European Cup to which Lazio qualified
  Netherlands, in 1990–1991 sanctions were imposed against AFC Ajax due to its fans, the Netherlands were restricted from the European Cup to which Ajax qualified

Corruption and controversy
Dissatisfied fans across Europe have referred to the organisation as UEFA mafia, including in Russia's top league, in Bulgaria's top league, and in a Champions League group stage match held in Sweden. The term has also been covered for its use outside of stadiums, for example during a protest in Kosovo outside an EU building following the Serbia v Albania (UEFA Euro 2016 qualifying) match. F.C. Copenhagen supporters displayed banners around the city, with slogans such as "UEFA MAFIA - THE PANDEMIC OF FOOTBALL", when UEFA ordered their 2019-20 Europa League round of 16 return leg be played behind closed doors, despite reduced capacity being allowed by the Danish government.

Following the 2015 FIFA corruption case, the then-president of UEFA, Michel Platini, was also involved in the case. Swiss prosecutors accused FIFA president Sepp Blatter of making a "disloyal payment" of $2m (£1.6m) to Mr Platini. Swiss attorney general, stated: "We didn't interview Mr Platini as a witness, that's not true. We investigated against him in between as a witness and an accused person". Both Platini and Sepp Blatter were banned from football-related activity. Platini appealed to Court of Arbitration for Sports, which lowered the six-year ban to four years. He further appealed to Swiss courts and the European Court of Human Rights but the courts rejected his appeals.

In 2019 UEFA's decision to host Europa League Cup final in Baku, Azerbaijan left one of the finalists, Arsenal, with a decision to withdraw their Armenian player Henrikh Mkhitaryan out of the competition due to safety concerns, and there has been long-standing debates about the extent to which the elite clubs or UEFA itself should exert the most influence on the game. UEFA's decision to partner with blockchain company Chiliz in February 2022 was criticised and described as 'incomprehensible' by fan groups across Europe.

See also

Resolutions

Awards:
The UEFA Plaque
UEFA Club Football Awards
UEFA Men's Player of the Year Award
UEFA Women's Player of the Year Award
UEFA President's Award
UEFA Team of the Year
UEFA Jubilee Awards
UEFA Golden Jubilee Poll
UEFA Euro Teams of the Tournament
UEFA EqualGame Award

Qualifications:
UEFA coefficient
UEFA Fair Play ranking
UEFA stadium categories

Match:
UEFA competitions
UEFA Celebration Match

UEFA congress
 UEFA congress

Financial fair play
UEFA Financial Fair Play Regulations

UEFA coefficient
 UEFA coefficient

UEFA presidents
 List of presidents of UEFA

Related links

 Timeline of football
 List of association football competitions
 International Federation of Association Football (FIFA)
 Asian Football Confederation (AFC)
 Confederation of African Football (CAF)
 Confederation of North, Central American and Caribbean Association Football (CONCACAF)
 Confederation of South American Football (CONMEBOL)
 Oceania Football Confederation (OFC)

Planned competitions
 Proposals for a European Super League in association football – A project for a sole pan-European Football League which UEFA executives have been involved

Notes

References

External links

  
 Union of European Football Association, Soccerlens.com. Retrieved: 9 October 2010.
 NZ Streaming Partner – Spark Sport - Retrieved: 23 September 2022

 
 
Sports governing bodies in Europe
Sports organizations established in 1954
International sports bodies based in Switzerland
FIFA confederations
1954 establishments in Switzerland
International organizations based in Europe